The Halfway River is a tributary of the River Hebert in  Nova Scotia, Canada.

The village of Halfway River is near the mouth of the river.

References

Rivers of Nova Scotia
Landforms of Cumberland County, Nova Scotia